Picture Book is a six-disc box set of material by the Kinks. It was released in December 2008 and compiles previously unreleased demos and outtakes together with selections from the group's four decade-long career. The first box set released by the band, the track listing for the collection is mostly in chronological order. The box set also comes with a 60-page booklet featuring a biography of the band, a timeline, and photos.

Track listing
Disc one
"Brian Matthew Introduces The Kinks"
"You Really Got Me"
"I'm a Hog for You Baby"
"I Believed You"
"Long Tall Sally"
"I Don't Need You Any More"
"Stop Your Sobbing"
"I Gotta Move"
"Don't Ever Let Me Go"
"All Day and All of the Night"
"Tired of Waiting for You"
"Come On Now" (sequence of takes 1-3)
"There's a New World Just Opening For Me" [Demo]
"Ev'rybody's Gonna Be Happy"
"Who'll Be the Next in Line"
"Time Will Tell"
"Set Me Free"
"I Need You"
"See My Friends"
"Wait Till the Summer Comes Along"
"I Go to Sleep" [Demo]
"A Little Bit of Sunlight" [Demo]
"This I Know" [Demo]
"A Well Respected Man"
"This Strange Effect"
"Milk Cow Blues"
"Ring the Bells"
"I'm on an Island"
"Till the End of the Day"
"Where Have All the Good Times Gone"
"All Night Stand" [Demo]
"And I Will Love You"
"Sitting on My Sofa"

Disc two
"Dedicated Follower of Fashion" [Alternate Take]
"She's Got Everything"
"Mr. Reporter" [Ray on vocals]
"Sunny Afternoon"
"I'm Not Like Everybody Else"
"This Is Where I Belong"
"Rosie Won't You Please Come Home"
"Too Much On My Mind"
"Session Man"
"End of the Season"
"Dead End Street" [early version]
"Village Green"
"Two Sisters"
"David Watts"
"Mister Pleasant"
"Waterloo Sunset"
"Death of a Clown"
"Lavender Hill"
"Good Luck Charm" [Studio Version]
"Autumn Almanac"
"Susannah's Still Alive"
"Animal Farm"
"Rosemary Rose"
"Berkeley Mews"
"Lincoln County"
"Picture Book"
"Days"
"Misty Water"

Disc three
"Love Me Till the Sun Shines" [BBC version]
"The Village Green Preservation Society"
"Big Sky"
"King Kong"
"Drivin'"
"Some Mother's Son"
"Victoria"
"Shangri-La"
"Arthur"
"Got to Be Free"
"Lola" [Mono single version]
"Get Back in Line"
"The Moneygoround"
"Strangers"
"Apeman" [Demo]
"God's Children"
"The Way Love Used to Be"
"Moments"
"Muswell Hillbilly"
"Oklahoma U.S.A."
"20th Century Man"
"Here Come the People in Grey"

Disc four
"Skin and Bone"
"Alcohol" [Live]
"Celluloid Heroes"
"Sitting in My Hotel"
"Supersonic Rocket Ship"
"You Don't Know My Name"
"One of the Survivors" [single version]
"Sitting in the Midday Sun"
"Sweet Lady Genevieve"
"Daylight"
"Mirror of Love" [single version]
"Artificial Man"
"Preservation"
"Slum Kids" [live, 1979]
"Holiday Romance"
"(A) Face in the Crowd"
"No More Looking Back"
"Sleepwalker"
"The Poseur"

Disc five
"Sleepless Night"
"Father Christmas"
"Misfits"
"A Rock 'N' Roll Fantasy"
"Little Bit of Emotion"
"Attitude"
"Hidden Quality"
"A Gallon of Gas" [longer studio edit with no overdubs]
"Catch Me Now I'm Falling"
"Nuclear Love" [Demo]
"Duke" [Demo]
"Maybe I Love You" [Demo]
"Stolen Away Your Heart" [Demo]
"Low Budget" [Live]
"Better Things"
"Destroyer"
"Yo-Yo"
"Art Lover"
"Long Distance"

Disc six
"Heart of Gold"
"Come Dancing" [Demo version]
"State of Confusion"
"Do It Again"
"Living on a Thin Line"
"Summer's Gone"
"How Are You"
"The Road" [Live]
"The Million-Pound-Semi-Detached"
"Down All the Days (Till 1992)"
"The Informer"
"Phobia"
"Only a Dream"
"Drift Away"
"Scattered"
"Do You Remember Walter?" [Live]
"To the Bone" [Demo]

References

2008 compilation albums
The Kinks compilation albums
Universal Records compilation albums
Albums produced by Ray Davies
Albums produced by Shel Talmy